The Oklahoma–Kansas League was a six–team minor league baseball league that existed in 1908. As its name indicates, the Class D level league consisted of teams from Oklahoma and Kansas.

History
The teams in the league were the Bartlesville Boosters, Independence Jewelers, Iola Champs, McAlester Miners, Muskogee Redskins and Tulsa Oilers.

Notable players include Larry Cheney, Joe Kelly and Ray Powell. Long–time major league player Deacon White managed in the league.

Before the season ended, McAlister and Iola disbanded. Tulsa won the league finals defeating pennant winner Bartlesville in the Finals.

Cities represented 
 Bartlesville, OK: Bartlesville Boosters 1908 
 Independence, KS: Independence Jewelers 1908 
 Iola, KS: Iola Champs 1908 
 McAlester, OK: McAlester Miners 1908 
 Muskogee, OK: Muskogee Redskins 1908 
 Tulsa, OK: Tulsa Oilers 1908

1908 Oklahoma-Kansas League standings
schedule
 McAlester disbanded July 5; Iola disbanded July 8. Playoffs: Bartlesville 2 games, Muskogee 0, for the first half title. Finals: Tulsa 3 games, Bartlesville 0.

References

External links
Baseball Reference

Defunct minor baseball leagues in the United States
Baseball leagues in Oklahoma
Baseball leagues in Kansas
Sports leagues established in 1908
Sports leagues disestablished in 1908